Veneti may refer to:

Veneti (Gaul), an ancient Celtic tribe described by classical sources as living in what is now Brittany, France
Adriatic Veneti, an ancient historical people of northeastern Italy, who spoke an Indo-European language
Vistula Veneti, an ancient historical people of north central Europe, who lived near the Vistula River and the Baltic Sea
Veneti, modern residents of the Veneto region of Italy

See also
Venet, a surname
Veneta (disambiguation)
Venetia (disambiguation)
Venetian (disambiguation)
Veneto (disambiguation)